Zeuach may refer to:

Zeubach (Wiesent), a river of Bavaria, Germany, tributary of the Wiesent
a district of Waischenfeld, a town in Bavaria, Germany